Jeff Klaiber (born February 15, 1962) is an American speed skater. He competed at the 1988 Winter Olympics and the 1992 Winter Olympics.

References

External links
 

1962 births
Living people
American male speed skaters
Olympic speed skaters of the United States
Speed skaters at the 1988 Winter Olympics
Speed skaters at the 1992 Winter Olympics
Sportspeople from Glen Cove, New York